David Giles (18 October 1926 – 6 January 2010) was a British  television director.

Credits

Hetty Wainthropp Investigates
Family Values (1998)
Something to Treasure (1998)
How Time Flies (1998)
Daughter of the Regiment (1997)
All Stitched Up (1997)
Just William (1994)
The Darling Buds of May
The Happiest Days of Your Lives: Part 1 (1993)
The Happiest Days of Your Lives: Part 2 (1993)
Oh! to Be in England: Part 1 (1992)
Oh! to Be in England: Part 2 (1992)
Christmas Is Coming (1991)
Forever Green
Episodes i.1, 2, 5, 6 (1989)
Hannay
The Fellowship of the Black Stone (1988)
London Embassy (1987)
Miss Marple: A Murder is Announced (1985)
 King John (1984)
Mansfield Park (1983)
The Barchester Chronicles (1982)
Fame Is the Spur (1982)
The BBC Shakespeare: The Life of Henry the Fifth (1979)
Henry IV, Part II (1979)
Henry IV, Part I (1979)
King Richard the Second (1978)
The Mayor of Casterbridge (1978)
The Emigrants (1976)
Play of the Month
When We Are Married (1975)
The Recruiting Officer (1973)
Twelfth Night (1974)
The Strauss Family (1972)
Sense and Sensibility (1971)
Hamlet (1970)
A Family At War (1970)
The First Churchills (1969)
The Dance of Death (1969)
Resurrection (1968)
Vanity Fair (1967)
The Forsyte Saga (1967)
The Old Wives' Table (1964)
Compact (1962)

References

External links

1926 births
2010 deaths
British television directors